Lu Guanqiu (17 January 1945 – 25 October 2017) was a Chinese billionaire entrepreneur, and the founder of Wanxiang Group. He was the 18th richest person in China, according to the Hurun Report China Rich List 2013, the 286th richest person in the world, and reportedly the richest person in Zhejiang Province. He was a delegate to the Chinese National People's Congress.

Early life
When he was 15 years old, he dropped out of school and became an ironsmith.

Career
In July 1969, he co-founded a factory with six other farmers, producing small agricultural machines. Lu later developed his factory into the present Wanxiang Group. It eventually became a large manufacturing conglomerate and a leading producer of automobile facilities and components.

Lu was the president of the board of the Wanxiang Group. Their headquarters are in Xiaoshan District, Hangzhou, Zhejiang. Lu was also a part-time professor for the EMBA program at Zhejiang University. He also was awarded an honorary doctorate from the Hong Kong Polytechnic University.

According to the Forbes China Rich List, Lu was ranked No. 33 with 13.13 billion Chinese Yuan (approximately US$ 1.87 billion). Lu was the richest individual living in Zhejiang Province.

Personal life
Lu was married, with four children, and lived in Hangzhou. He died on 25 October 2017, aged 72.

References

External links
 China Vitae - Lu Guanqiu 
 Lu Guanqiu. (Hurun Report - Webpage for China's Business Leaders) 
 Wanxiang Group official website 

1945 births
2017 deaths
Billionaires from Zhejiang
Businesspeople from Hangzhou
Zhejiang University alumni
Academic staff of Zhejiang University
Delegates to the 9th National People's Congress
Delegates to the 10th National People's Congress
Delegates to the 11th National People's Congress